Shayna Levine is an American film and TV actress.

Levine joined the cast of ABC's All My Children on September 24, 2002, playing the role of Lily Montgomery (she is the third actress to play Lily), the adopted autistic daughter of Jackson Montgomery (Walt Willey).

Levine performed in the films Palindromes 2003 where she earned critical acclaim for her supporting role as Aviva. She also appears on an episode of ''Law & Order: Criminal Intent' and various stage performances including her debut at the Ensemble Studio Theater in New York.

She is a big fan of the TV-Show "The Walking Dead".

Filmography

External links

Shayna Levine at Yahoo! Movies

Year of birth missing (living people)
Living people
American soap opera actresses
American television actresses
Place of birth missing (living people)
21st-century American women